Salomea Kempner (1880–1940?) was a Polish psychoanalyst, assistant physician at the Cantonal Insane Asylum in Rheinau, Switzerland.

Life
Salomea Kempner was from Plock, Poland. In 1921 she moved to Vienna, and in June 1922 was elected a member of the Vienna Psychoanalytic Society. In 1923 she moved to Berlin, where she worked at the Berlin Polyclinic, and became a member of the Berlin Psychoanalytic Society in January 1925. In 1935 she and Philipp Sarasin, with whom she had a longstanding relationship, visited Freud together. She became a training analyst in 1936. She supervised the training of Adelheid Koch. She continued conducting psychoanalytic control sessions in her apartment until 1937, but disappeared without trace in the Warsaw Ghetto.

Works
 Versuche zum mikroskopischen Nachweis der Narkose der Nerven[Attempts at microscopic detection of nerve anesthesia]. Zürich, 1909.
 'Beitrag zur Oralerotik'. Internationale Zeitschrift für Psychoanalyse, Vol. 11, p. 69-77, 1925
 'Some remarks on oral erotism'. International Journal of Psycho-Analysis, Vol. 6, pp. 419–429, 1925
 (trans. with W. Zaniewicki) Wstęp do psychoanalizy by Sigmund Freud. Translation from the German Vorlesungen zur Einführung in die Psychoanalyse. Warsaw: J. Przeworski, 1935.

References

1880 births
1940 deaths
Year of death uncertain
Polish psychoanalysts
People who died in the Warsaw Ghetto
German–Polish translators
Translators of Sigmund Freud
Polish expatriates in Austria
Polish expatriates in Germany